Ian Grenville Cross  (born 15 June 1951) is a British barrister who was appointed Director of Public Prosecutions (DPP) of Hong Kong on 15 October 1997, and held this post for over 12 years, until 21 October 2009. He was the first DPP to be appointed after the transfer of the sovereignty of Hong Kong on 1 July 1997, and the appointment signalled that suitably qualified expatriates who were committed to Hong Kong still had a role to play in government in the post-colonial era. A career prosecutor, Cross was the seventh holder of the post since its creation in 1979, and the longest serving. On 26 June 2011, he was elected the Vice-Chairman (Senate) of the International Association of Prosecutors, of which he is a Senator-for-Life.

Education and early career

Ian Grenville Cross (he would later drop his forename) was the eldest son of Lt Col JA Cross (dec'd), formerly of the Intelligence Corps, the Lancashire Fusiliers (XX Regiment of Foot) and the Suffolk Regiment (XII Regiment of Foot), and his late wife, Doreen (née Hyde). He was educated privately at Culford School (1959–69), Suffolk, England, where he chaired the Debating Society. In 1973, he graduated in law from the University of Southampton, where, at different times, he chaired both the Conservative and Unionist Association and the Conservative Monday Club. He read for the Bar at the College of Law, Chancery Lane, London EC4 (1973–74). 

Cross was called to the Bar of England and Wales in 1974 by the Middle Temple, of which he was a Blackstone Entrance Exhibitioner (major), and was admitted in 1981 to the Bar of Hong Kong. He practised on the South Eastern Circuit of England and Wales, from the chambers of Jeffrey Thomas, QC, MP, at No. 3 Temple Gardens, London, EC4, from 1974 to 1976. He was then appointed an in-house prosecutor by HM Customs and Excise Department for England and Wales, from 1976 to 1978. He joined the Attorney General's Chambers (now the Department of Justice) of Hong Kong as Crown Counsel in 1978.

Cross was the founding chairman of the Charles James Fox Society, of which Group Captain Maurice Fox-Strangways, 9th Earl of Ilchester, a descendant of the statesman, was patron. The Society met annually at the Intrepid Fox public house, in Soho, and at the Fox memorial, in Bloomsbury Square, on the anniversary of his death, for remembrance. The Society promoted an awareness of the life and achievements of the erstwhile Whig leader and foreign secretary.

Career in public prosecutions

As DPP, Cross, with the support of Secretary for Justice Elsie Leung, initiated a programme of modernisation, transparency and internationalisation, to promote the One country, two systems formula in Hong Kong in the area of public prosecutions. He introduced three strategic reviews, designed to strengthen his Office. He created a new sub-division for appellate advocacy, with a mandate to enhance the standards of prosecution in the appeal courts. He expanded his Office to develop its capacity to prosecute all types of crime, appointed Prosecution Policy Co-ordinators to provide expert advice within their portfolios, and created the Computer Crime Team.

Cross established the Standing Committee on Disclosure, to keep the disclosure arrangements of prosecutors under regular review. He developed close links with victim groups, most notably Against Child Abuse, many of which met directly with prosecutors. He arranged advanced training courses for prosecutors at all levels, and introduced training seminars for private counsel who prosecute on the DPP's fiat. Close ties were also forged with prosecutors in other jurisdictions, and he lectured widely in Mainland China and Macao.

Prior to his appointment as DPP, Cross served, from 1991 to 1997, as the Deputy DPP of Hong Kong, specialising in appellate advocacy. In that capacity, he prosecuted the last criminal case from Hong Kong to be heard by the Judicial Committee of the Privy Council (R v Peter Maclennan), in June 1997, and the first criminal case to be heard by the Court of Final Appeal of Hong Kong (HKSAR v Mui Po Chu), in September 1997. He conducted twelve appeals before the Judicial Committee of the Privy Council between 1988 and 1997, and, after the transfer of sovereignty of Hong Kong, he prosecuted six appeals before the Hong Kong Court of Final Appeal (and its Appeal Committee), which replaced the Judicial Committee of the Privy Council as Hong Kong's ultimate appellate body on 1 July 1997.

As a Senior Assistant Crown Prosecutor, Cross headed the Criminal Appeals Unit of the then Legal Department of Hong Kong, from 1986 to 1991. Prior to that, he was, from 1978 to 1986, a general prosecutor in the department, conducting criminal trials in the High Court, District Court and Magistrates Court.

Cross was appointed Queen's Counsel in 1990 (which became King's Counsel upon the death of Queen Elizabeth II on 8 September 2022) , becoming Senior Counsel in 1997, following the transfer of sovereignty of Hong Kong. Aged 38, he was the youngest prosecutor to have taken silk in Hong Kong, a distinction that he retains. From 1999 to 2010, Cross served as an Official Justice of the Peace (JP). The Hong Kong Tourism Board appointed Cross as its Hong Kong Convention Ambassador for 2003 to 2005, and again for 2006–07.

Cross was awarded the Silver Bauhinia Star (SBS) in the Hong Kong Special Administrative Region Establishment Day Honours List 2010. According to the citation, the award was in recognition of his work for the government and the community, "particularly his valuable contribution to the development of prosecution services in Hong Kong and in raising the profile of the Hong Kong prosecution services in the international arena".

International work

As DPP, Cross promoted contacts with prosecutors in other parts of China, as well as at the global level. On 1 January 2001, he led his Office into organisational membership of the International Association of Prosecutors, as its 75th organisational member. In 2004, he hosted the association's 2nd Asia-Pacific Regional Conference, the theme of which was "Dealing with Drug Offenders". In 2007, he hosted the association's 12th annual conference and general meeting, the theme of which was "Relations with Others: Transparency, Accountability and Independence". In 2007, he was elected to the executive committee of the association, for a 3-year term. On 7 September 2010, at a ceremony in The Hague, he received the association's Certificate of Merit from the president of the association, James Hamilton. He is currently serving in the Senate of the association.

Later appointments

After relinquishing his post as DPP, Cross, who had previously declined a judgeship in the High Court, accepted a series of appointments, mostly law-related.

On 22 October 2009, he was appointed special counsel to the Secretary for Justice.

On 23 April 2010, he was appointed adjunct professor of law, Institute of Procedural Law Research, China University of Political Science and Law (Beijing).

On 1 September 2010, he was appointed honorary professor of law, Faculty of Law, The University of Hong Kong.

On 7 September 2010, he was appointed a Senator-for-Life of the International Association of Prosecutors.

On 28 September 2010, he was appointed sentencing editor of Hong Kong Cases (LexisNexis).

On 11 February 2011, he was appointed visiting professor of law, Faculty of Law, The Chinese University of Hong Kong.

On 26 June 2011, he was elected vice-chairman (Senate) of the International Association of Prosecutors.

On 26 April 2013, he was appointed by the International Association of Prosecutors to chair its Standing Committee on Prosecutors in Difficulty.

On 1 November 2013, he was appointed honorary consultant to the Child Protection Institute, by Against Child Abuse, Hong Kong.

On 26 October 2016, he was appointed visiting professor of law, Zhongnan University of Economics and Law (Wuhan).

On 3 April 2018, he was appointed Leave Means Leave Ambassador, Hong Kong & Macao.

On 20 November 2018, he was appointed patron of Against Child Abuse, Hong Kong.

On 1 July 2021, he was awarded the Gold Bauhinia Star by the Chief Executive.

On 1 December 2021, he was appointed a member of the Council of the University of Hong Kong.

On 8 April 2022, he was appointed the chairman of the University of Hong Kong's Discrimination Complaints Committee and Staff Grievances Panel. 

On 20 April 2022, he was appointed to the 90-member advisory Presidium of HKSAR Chief Executive candidate (and subsequent HKSAR Chief Executive), John Lee Ka-chiu.

Support for the National Security Law in Hong Kong

On 27 May 2020 Cross spoke to Dot Dot News (Hong Kong based, owned by media group controlled by the Hong Kong Liaison Office) in a filmed interview entitled 'National Security Law for HK | Insight from Grenville Cross: Is it legitimate?'  In an interview with Xinhua News Agency in June 2020, he defended the National Security Law in Hong Kong, stating that the law will "enable 'one country, two systems' to remain stable" and that "a minimalist approach has been adopted by the NPC to combat the immediate dangers to the HKSAR". After the National Security Law came into effect, Cross stated that Malaysia and Singapore "ha[ve] national security laws which are far more draconian than Hong Kong's, in terms of preventive detention, bail denial, admissibility of incriminating evidence, and punishment." He has argued that "[t]he new law...while recognizing that national security must be safeguarded, also acknowledges that the rights of a defendant must also be protected, which is exactly the approach adopted throughout the common law world." Law professor Jerome A. Cohen opined in June 2020, before the publication and enactment of the national security law, that the statements by Cross in defence of the law were "a far cry" from government assurances that the law would focus on violent protests and vandals. In support of his view, Cohen cited the belief of Cross that those who supported an organization outlawed in mainland China in some way might be subjected to persecution under the law.

Editorships and published works

Cross is the co-author of Sentencing in Hong Kong, now in its tenth edition. He is the Sentencing Editor of Archbold Criminal Pleading, Evidence and Practice. He serves on the Editorial Board of Hong Kong Cases. He was previously General Editor of the Criminal Appeals Bulletin (1986–2009), and Consultant Editor of Hong Kong Law Reports and Digest (1988–2006).

Personal life

Cross is married to Elaine Tsui Yee-lin 徐怡玲, PMSM, MCIL, an artist and a former Superintendent of the Hong Kong Police Force.

References

1951 births
Living people
People educated at Culford School
Alumni of the University of Southampton
Hong Kong civil servants
Recipients of the Gold Bauhinia Star
Recipients of the Silver Bauhinia Star
Place of birth missing (living people)
British expatriates in Hong Kong
Conservative Party (UK) politicians
Hong Kong justices of the peace
Hong Kong Queen's Counsel
Hong Kong Senior Counsel